Johannes Evangelista Gossner (14 December 1773 – 20 March 1858), German divine and philanthropist, was born at Hausen near Augsburg.

He was educated at the University of Dillingen. He, like Martin Boos and others, came under the spell of the Evangelical movement promoted by Johann Michael Sailer, the professor of pastoral theology.

After taking priests' orders, Gossner held livings at Dirlewang (1804-1811) and Munich (1811-1817), but his evangelical tendencies brought about his dismissal and in 1826 he formally left the Roman Catholic for the Protestant communion. As Reformed (Calvinist) minister of Bethlehem's Church (1829-1846), a Lutheran and Reformed simultaneum in Berlin, he was conspicuous not only for practical and effective preaching, but for the founding of schools, asylums and missionary agencies.

In 1836, he founded the Gossner Mission, which aimed for a holistic understanding of mission (preaching the gospel and church social service). Its purpose was “to train young men from the craftsman class and every other class in a shorter and less expensive way than usual to become assistants in the mission, to become deacons, catechists, school teachers and collaborators in the holy work.” They have to work in “apostolic, unbound and humble simplicity”, following the example of the congregation of the Moravian Church “under the presidency of Jesus Christ.“ This missionary work is still active today in Germany and, among other places, in India and Nepal. 

Lives of Gossner have been written by Bethmann Hollweg (Berlin, 1858) and Hermann Dalton (Berlin, 1878).

Works
 John Goszner's Treasury: Bible Meditations for Each Day in the Year, With Devotional Songs to the Furtherance of Family Prayer and Piety
 The Heart of Man: Either a Temple of God, Or a Habitation of Satan : Represented in Ten Emblematical Figures, Calculated to Awaken and Promote a Christian Disposition
 The Spiritual Casket of Daily Bible Meditations; for the Furtherance of Family Godliness and Devotion

Sources
 Werner Raupp (Ed.): Mission in Quellentexten. Geschichte der Deutschen Evangelischen Mission von der Reformation bis zur Weltmissionskonferenz Edinburgh 1910, Erlangen/Bad Liebenzell 1990 (ISBN 3-87214-238-0 / 3-88002-424-3), S. 258-261 (Sources from the founding periode, incl. Introd. and Lit.).

Further reading
•  Walter Holsten: Johannes Evangelista Goßner, Glaube und Gemeinde. Göttingen 1949. 
•  Charlotte Sauer: Fremdling und Bürger. Lebensbild des Johannes Evangelista Goßner. Ed., Berlin 1966 (2. Edit., 1967; new Edition: Stuttgart 1969).

References

See also
Gossner Theological College
Gossner Evangelical Lutheran Church in Chotanagpur and Assam
North Western Gossner Evangelical Lutheran Church

References

External links
Gossner, Johannes Evangelista, from Schaff-Herzog Encyclopedia of Religious Knowledge
Gossner Missionary Society, from Christian Cyclopedia
Gossner Mission Homepage

1773 births
1858 deaths
19th-century German Roman Catholic priests
German Protestant clergy
German philanthropists
Converts to Calvinism from Roman Catholicism
Founders of Indian schools and colleges